ALT is the twelfth studio album by English progressive rock band Van der Graaf Generator. It was released 25 June 2012. There are only instrumental songs on the album.

The opening track "Earlybird" has inspired the Earlybird Project (2014-2015), a non-profit environmental art project, an appeal for the preservation of the world. This project is the result of the collaboration between the Italian-Russian artist Vladislav Shabalin, who works with fossils, and Van der Graaf Generator.

Track listing 
"Earlybird"
"Extractus"
"Sackbutt"
"Colossus"
"Batty Loop"
"Splendid"
"Repeat After Me"
"Elsewhere"
"Here's one I Made Earlier"
"Midnite or So"
"D'Accord"
"Mackerel Ate Them"
"Tuesday, the Riff"
"Dronus"

Vinyl version listing

Side one 
"Colossus"
"Repeat After Me"
"Earlybird"
"Elsewhere"
"loop J 2"

Side two 
"D'Accord"
"Mackerel Ate Them"
"Here's one I Made Earlier"
"Dronus"

Personnel 
Van der Graaf Generator 
 Peter Hammill − guitars, keyboards
 Hugh Banton − organ, bass, bass pedals
 Guy Evans − drums

References

External links 
 Van der Graaf Generator - ALT (2012) album review by James Allen, credits & releases at AllMusic.com
 Van der Graaf Generator - ALT (2012) album releases & credits at Discogs.com
 Van der Graaf Generator - ALT (2012) album credits & user reviews at ProgArchives.com
 Van der Graaf Generator - ALT (2012) album to be listened as stream at Spotify.com

Van der Graaf Generator albums
2012 albums